The thermal time hypothesis is a possible solution to the problem of time in classical and quantum theory as has been put forward by Carlo Rovelli and Alain Connes. Physical time flow is modeled as a fundamental property of the theory, a macroscopic feature of thermodynamical origin.

Overview 

Generally covariant theories do not have a notion of a distinguished physical time with respect to which everything evolves. However, it is not needed for the full formulation and interpretation of the theory. The dynamical laws are determined by correlations which are sufficient to make predictions. But then a mechanism is needed which explains how the familiar notion of time eventually emerges from the timeless structure to become such an important ingredient of the macroscopic world we live in as well as of our conscious experience.

See also 
 Thermodynamics
 Loop quantum gravity

References

Time in physics
Philosophy of time
Emergence